Anagotus is a weevil genus in the tribe Aterpini.

Species 
Anagotus carinirostris -  Anagotus fairburni -  Anagotus graniger -  Anagotus halli -  Anagotus hamiltoni -  Anagotus helmsi -  Anagotus latirostris -  Anagotus lewisi -  Anagotus oconnori - A. peelensis -  Anagotus rugosus -  Anagotus stephenensis -  Anagotus turbotti

References 

Cyclominae